Hilary Woods is an Irish musician born in Dublin. She is a solo artist, previously a member of the alternative rock band JJ72, with which she played bass guitar from 1996 until 2003. JJ72 had success with two Top 20 albums in the early 2000s with Woods as the bassist. She quit the music industry until 2014, returning with her first solo EP entitled Night.

Woods' solo albums have a gentle, ambient folk sound with "nocturnal keyboard-based songs." Her musical inspiration comes from filmmakers, electronic artists, experimental noise, and folk music traditions. She is currently signed to Sacred Bones Records.

Biography 
Woods was raised in Dublin by parents that fostered a musical environment, playing classical, folk and rock LPs in the home. Her parents encouraged her to play music, and she began learning her main instrument, the piano. Her brother was encouraged to play instruments as well. As an 18-year-old, Woods joined the band JJ72 with singer/guitarist Mark Greaney and drummer Fergal Matthews. Woods played bass in the band from the late 90's to the early 2000's.

JJ72 was signed to Sony imprint Lakota Records and released their debut self-titled album in 2000, followed by their second album in 2002. Both albums were successful and reached Top 20 charts in the U.K. and Ireland. The group toured for a total of four years, after which Woods left the band and did not return to the music industry for more than a decade.

A year after leaving JJ72, Woods started a family and focused on raising her daughter. 

Before returning to the music industry, Woods took college courses that sparked creativity and compelled her to continue making music. Notably, she was inspired by filmmakers such as Wong Kar-wai and Chris Marker. She also expanded her musical horizons by listening to electronic artists such as Jon Hopkins and Vincent Gallo. 

After her spell in fine art school and having studied literature and film in college, she returned to music under the name The River Cry for one confidential self-titled album in 2013, then started to release EPs under her own name ('Night' in 2014 and 'Heartbox' in 2016); leading to her debut solo record Colt in 2018 as a Sacred Bones artist. After releasing her debut solo EP Night, Woods began touring again. Her most recent album, Birthmarks, was released in 2020.

Discography

Albums

With JJ72
JJ72 (2000)
I to Sky (2002)

LPs 
The River Cry (2013)
Colt (2018)
Birthmarks (2020)

EPs 

 Night (2014)
 Heartbox (2016)
 Feral Hymns (2021)

Singles 

 N.I.B. (2021)
 In Heaven (2022)

References

Living people
Irish rock singers
Musicians from Dublin (city)
Irish bass guitarists
Year of birth missing (living people)
Place of birth missing (living people)
Sacred Bones Records artists